Maggiolini is an Italian surname. Notable people with the surname include:

Alessandro Maggiolini (1931–2008), Italian Roman Catholic bishop
Giuseppe Maggiolini (1738–1814), Italian woodworker
Stefanía Maggiolini (born 1986), Uruguayan footballer
Tiziano Maggiolini (born 1980), Italian footballer

Italian-language surnames